Nirnayam may refer to:
 Nirnayam (1991 film), a Telugu film directed by Priyadarshan which is a remake of his own Vandanam
 Nirnayam (1995 film), a Malayalam film directed by Sangeeth Sivan
 Nirnayam (2013 film), a Tamil film